Babu Thiruvalla is an Indian film producer, director, and scriptwriter who works in Malayalam films. He produced films such as Oru Minnaminunginte Nurungu Vettam (1987) and Amaram (1991) under the banner Symphony Creations. Most of the films he produced got either State(Kerala) or National(India) award in some category. His first directorial venture 'Thaniyae' bagged more than 20 Awards including State Award and Indian Panorama.His directorial venture Thanichalla Njan (2012) won the National Film Award for Best Feature Film on National Integration. He was a Jury member for selecting Indian film for the Oscar award 2016. Latest venture in film field was with doing a segment for Crossroad (2017 film) in directorial role.jury member of IFFK 2019.

As producer 
Oru Minnaminunginte Nurungu Vettam (1987)
Amaram (1991)
Savidham (1992)
Samagamam (1993)
Arabia (1995)
Kannaki (2001)

As director 
Thaniye (2007, also as writer)
Thanichalla Njan  (2012)
Mounam
Sound of Morality (Short Fiction)

Awards
Padmarajan Award for Best Film (2008, won - Thaniye)
Best Film Award by the Atlas Film Critics Association (2008, won - Thaniye)
ALA Award (2008, won - Thaniye)
Kerala State Film Award for Best Début Director (2008, won - Thaniye)
Ujala-Asianet Film Award for Best Script Writer (2008, won - Thaniye, shared with Nedumudi Venu)
Nargis Dutt Award for Best Feature Film on National Integration (2013, won - Thanichchalla Njaan)
Bharatan Puraskaram for Best Feature Film  (2008, won - Thaniye)
Jhon Abraham Puraskaram for Best Feature Film  (2008, won - Thaniye)
Filmfare Award for Best Director – Malayalam for Thaniye in 2008

References

External links
 

Year of birth missing (living people)
Living people
Malayalam film directors
Malayalam film producers
21st-century Indian film directors
Malayalam screenwriters
Directors who won the Best Film on National Integration National Film Award